is a passenger railway station located in the city of  Hachiōji, Tokyo, Japan, operated by East Japan Railway Company (JR East).

Lines
The station is 3.1 kilometers from the official starting point of the line at Hachiōji Station.

Station layout

The station consists of two ground-level opposed side platforms serving two tracks, which form a passing loop on the single-track line. The tracks are connected by the elevated station building, which is built above and perpendicular to the tracks. The station is attended.

Platforms

History
The station opened on 10 June 1959. It became part of the East Japan Railway Company (JR East) with the breakup of the Japanese National Railways (JNR) on 1 April 1987.

The southern section of the Hachikō Line between Hachiōji and Komagawa was electrified on 16 March 1996, with through services commencing between Hachiōji and Kawagoe.

Passenger statistics
In fiscal 2019, the station was used by an average of 9,649 passengers daily (boarding passengers only).

The passenger figures (boarding passengers only) for previous years are as shown below.

Surrounding area
Japan National Route 20
Tokyo Metropolitan Hachioji Higashi High School
Tokyo Metropolitan University Hino Campus
Tokai University School of Medicine Hachioji Hospital
Olympus Factory

References

External links

 JR East station information 

Railway stations in Japan opened in 1959
Railway stations in Tokyo
Stations of East Japan Railway Company
Hachikō Line
Hachiōji, Tokyo